Chambal Ke Daku is a 1982 Hindi-language action drama film directed by S. Azhar and produced by R. Sandhu. Two real life dacoits of Chambal, Mohar Singh and Madho Singh starred in this film. It is the first movie in India where two criminals have portrayed their own characters on celluloid.

Cast
 Javed Khan (actor)
 Madhu Malini
 Nazneen
 Hina Kausar
 Birbal
 Ramesh Deo
 Mohar Singh
 Madho Singh

Soundtrack
All songs were composed by B. T. Singh and Gauhar Kanpuri, except the song "Mujhe Mora Jobanwa". It was written by Reshab Jain.

"Asha Ka Sooraj Dooba Hain" - Asha Bhosle
"Ram Kasam Yeh Jawaani" - Asha Bhosle 
"Are Hardam Kam Zaroori" - Asha Bhosle, Javed Khan
"Uljhan Ho, Chahe Koi Aa Jaaye Mushkil" - Mohammed Rafi, Asha Bhosle, Manna Dey
"Mujhe Mora Jobanwa" - Vijayta Pandit, Dilraj Kaur
"Koi Aamewala Hain" - Usha Mangeshkar

References

External links
 

1980s action drama films
1980s Hindi-language films
Indian action drama films
Films about outlaws